Ewa Danuta Malik (born January 11, 1961 in Sosnowiec) is a Polish politician. She was elected to the Sejm on September 25, 2005 getting 16 537 votes in 32 Sosnowiec district, candidating from the  Law and Justice list.

See also
Members of Polish Sejm 2005-2007

External links
Ewa Malik - parliamentary page - includes declarations of interest, voting record, and transcripts of speeches.

1961 births
Living people
People from Sosnowiec
Women members of the Sejm of the Republic of Poland
Law and Justice politicians
21st-century Polish women politicians
Members of the Polish Sejm 2005–2007
Members of the Polish Sejm 2007–2011
Members of the Polish Sejm 2011–2015
Members of the Polish Sejm 2015–2019
Members of the Polish Sejm 2019–2023
University of Silesia in Katowice alumni